Nyungwe (Cinyungwe or Nhungue) is a Bantu language of Mozambique. It is used as a trade language throughout Tete Province.

Geographic distribution
Nyungwe is spoken by more than 439,000 people in Mozambique along the Zambezi River, principally in Tete Province.

Official status
While Portuguese is the only official language of Mozambique, Nyungwe is one of the recognized national languages.

Phonology
The phonological inventory is:

Vowels

Consonants

History
Many vocabulary words collected by David Livingstone in Tete in the 1850s, and Courtois in the 1890s are similar to the words in common use by Nyungwe-speaking people today.

Examples

References

External links
 O Centro de Estudos de Línguas Moçambicanas (NELIMO) The Mozambican authority on languages.
 Publications in Nyungwe at lidemo.net 
 A blog about the Nyungwe Bible translation

Nyasa languages
Languages of Mozambique